Hermawan Susanto (born 24 September 1967) is a former Indonesian badminton player who played at the world level during the 1990s.

Career 
Susanto was one of an impressive cadre of Indonesians who won numerous international tournaments and captured successive Thomas Cup (men's world team) titles during the era. Susanto came close to winning two of badminton's three biggest events for individual players; he was a bronze medalist in men's singles at the 1992 Olympic Games in Barcelona, and was runner-up to fellow countryman Joko Suprianto at the (then biennial) World Championships in 1993.

Susanto's accomplishments included victories at the Dutch Open (1990, 1992), the Denmark Open (1992), the China Open (1992), the Chinese Taipei Open (1991, 1995), the Hong Kong Open (1993), the U.S. Open (1995), and the Malaysia Open (1997).

Personal life 
Susanto married another former Indonesian player, Sarwendah Kusumawardhani, in 1995. They have one child named Andrew Susanto, who is currently following his parents' footsteps in playing badminton.

Achievements

Olympic Games 
Men's singles

World Championships 
Men's singles

World Cup 
Men's singles

Asian Championships 
Men's singles

Asian Cup 
Men's singles

IBF World Grand Prix 
The World Badminton Grand Prix sanctioned by International Badminton Federation (IBF) from 1983 to 2006.

Men's singles

 IBF Grand Prix tournament
 IBF Grand Prix Finals tournament

References

External links 
 
 

1967 births
Living people
People from Kudus Regency
Sportspeople from Central Java
Indonesian people of Chinese descent
Indonesian male badminton players
Badminton players at the 1992 Summer Olympics
Olympic badminton players of Indonesia
Olympic bronze medalists for Indonesia
Olympic medalists in badminton
Medalists at the 1992 Summer Olympics
Badminton players at the 1990 Asian Games
Badminton players at the 1994 Asian Games
Asian Games gold medalists for Indonesia
Asian Games bronze medalists for Indonesia
Asian Games medalists in badminton
Medalists at the 1990 Asian Games
Medalists at the 1994 Asian Games
World No. 1 badminton players
21st-century Indonesian people
20th-century Indonesian people